The men's 1500 metre freestyle event at the 2014 Asian Games took place on 26 September 2014 at Munhak Park Tae-hwan Aquatics Center.

Schedule
All times are Korea Standard Time (UTC+09:00)

Records

Results 

 Park Tae-hwan of South Korea originally finished 4th, but was later disqualified after he tested positive for Nebido.

References

Results

External links
Official website

Swimming at the 2014 Asian Games